Volley fire, as a military tactic, is (in its simplest form) the concept of having soldiers shoot in the same direction en masse.  In practice, it often consists of having a line of soldiers all discharge their weapons simultaneously at the enemy forces on command, known as "firing a volley", followed by more lines of soldiers repeating the same maneuver in turns.  This is usually to compensate for the inaccuracy, slow rate of fire (as many early ranged weapons took a long time and much effort to reload), limited effective range and stopping power of individual weapons, which often requires a massed saturation attack to be effective.  The volley fire, specifically the musketry volley technique (also known as the countermarch), requires lines of soldiers to step to the front, fire on command and then march back into a column to reload, while the next row repeats the same process.

The term "volley" came from Middle French , substantivation of the verb , which in turns came from Latin , both meaning "to fly", referring to the pre-firearm practice of archers mass-shooting into the air to shower their enemy with arrows.  While the tactic of volley fire is usually associated with Dutch military thinkers in the late 16th century, its principles have been applied to crossbow infantry since at least the Chinese Tang dynasty.

Types of weapons

Crossbows

Although volley fire is most often associated with firearms, the concept of continuous and concerted rotating fire may have been practiced using crossbows since at least the Han dynasty as described in the Han-Xiongnu Wars in the Records of the Grand Historian, although it was not until the Tang dynasty that detailed illustrations appeared. During the An Lushan Rebellion the Tang general Li Guangbi successfully deployed a spear crossbow formation against the rebel cavalry forces under Shi Siming. In 756 Shi Siming raced ahead of the main army with his mounted troops to intercept Li Guangbi's Shuofang army near the town of Changshan. Li took Changshan in advance and set up his men with their backs to the town walls to prevent a sneak attack. The spearmen formed a dense defensive formation while 1,000 crossbowmen divided into four sections to provide continuous volley fire. When Shi's cavalry engaged Li's Shuofang army they were completely unable to close in on his troops and suffered heavy losses, forcing a withdrawal.

The 759 AD text, Tai bai yin jing (太白陰經) by Tang military official Li Quan (李筌), contains the oldest known depiction and description of the volley fire technique. The illustration shows a rectangular crossbow formation with each circle representing one man. In the front is a line labeled "shooting crossbows" (發弩) and behind that line are rows of crossbowmen, two facing right and two facing left, and they are labeled "loading crossbows" (張弩). The commander (大將軍) is situated in the middle of the formation and to his right and left are vertical rows of drummers (鼓) who coordinate the firing and reloading procedure in procession: who loaded their weapons, stepped forward to the outer ranks, shot, and then retired to reload. According to Li Quan, "the classics say that the crossbow is fury. It is said that its noise is so powerful that it sounds like fury, and that's why they named it this way," and by using the volley fire method there is no end to the sound and fury, and the enemy is unable to approach. Here he is referring to the word for "crossbow" nu which is also a homophone for the word for fury, nu.

The encyclopedic text known as the Tongdian by Du You from 801 AD also provides a description of the volley fire technique: "[Crossbow units] should be divided into teams that can concentrate their arrow shooting.… Those in the center of the formations should load [their bows] while those on the outside of the formations should shoot. They take turns, revolving and returning, so that once they've loaded they exit [i.e., proceed to the outer ranks] and once they've shot they enter [i.e., go within the formations]. In this way, the sound of the crossbow will not cease and the enemy will not harm us."

While the virtues of the rotating volley fire were understood during the Tang dynasty, the Wujing Zongyao written during the Song dynasty notes that it was not utilized to its full effectiveness due to their fear of cavalry charges. The author's solution was to drill the soldiers to the point where rather than hide behind shield units upon the approach of melee infantry, they would "plant the feet like a firm mountain, and, unmoving at the front of the battle arrays, shoot thickly to the middle [of the enemy], and none among them will not fall down dead." The Song volley fire formation was described thus: "Those in the center of the formation should load while those on the outside of the formation should shoot, and when [the enemy gets] close, then they should shelter themselves with small shields [literally side shields, 旁牌], each taking turns and returning, so that those who are loading are within the formation. In this way the crossbows will not cease sounding." In addition to the Tang formation, the Song illustration also added a new label to the middle line of crossbowmen between the firing and reloading lines, known as the "advancing crossbows." Both Tang and Song manuals also made aware to the reader that "the accumulated arrows should be shot in a stream, which means that in front of them there must be no standing troops, and across [from them] no horizontal formations."

The volley fire technique was used to great effect by the Song during the Jin-Song Wars. In the fall of 1131 the Jin commander Wuzhu (兀朮) invaded the Shaanxi region but was defeated by general Wu Jie (吳玠) and his younger brother Wu Lin (吳璘). The History of Song elaborates on the battle in detail:

After losing half his army Wuzhu escaped back to the north, only to invade again in the following year. Again, he was defeated while trying to breach a strategic pass. The History of Song states that during the battle Wu Jie's brother Wu Lin "used the Standing-Firm Arrow Teams, who shot alternately, and the arrows fell like rain, and the dead piled up in layers, but the enemy climbed over them and kept climbing up." This passage is especially noteworthy for its mention of a special technique being utilized as it is one of the very few times that the History of Song has elaborated on a specific tactic.

The crossbow volley fire remained a popular tactic into the Ming dynasty. The martial artist Cheng Chongdou, who studied at the Shaolin Temple, was a particularly avid proponent of the mixed crossbow volley and melee infantry force, which would ideally carry both a wearable crossbow strapped behind the back as well as a personal melee weapon such as the lance or sword. He provides a detailed description of the volley fire technique in a military text ca. 1621:

Bows

In Europe volley fire was also used by archers, for example at the Battle of Agincourt in 1415.

Firearms

Usage in individual nations and cultures

Early Ming dynasty
The earliest possible employment of volley fire for firearms occurred in late 14th century China during a military conflict between Ming and Mong Mao forces. Volley fire was also possibly implemented with firearms in 1414 during the Yongle Emperor's campaigns against the Mongols, and possibly again in another expedition in 1422. However, the language used in these sources is unclear as to whether or not repeating fire was part of the technique implemented. For example, during the 1388 anti-insurrection war waged against the Mong Mao by the Ming general Mu Ying, the Ming troops equipped with guns and fire arrows were arrayed in three lines. The general Mu Ying explained this was so that "when the elephants advance, the front line of guns and arrows will shoot all at once. If they do not retreat, the next line will continue this. If they still do not retreat, then the third line will continue this." When the armored war elephants broke into a run, charging the Ming lines, the Ming forces stood their ground, "shooting arrows and stones, the noise shaking the mountains and vallies. The elephants shook with fear and ran." According to the Ming Shilu, half the elephants were killed while 37 were captured, and of the 100,000 strong insurrection force, at least 30,000 were killed, and 10,000 were captured. Andrade and other historians have interpreted this passage as evidence of volley fire, however he admits that it is ambiguous as to whether or not the Ming lines practiced repeated fire and reloading, so at best it can only be considered a limited form of volley fire.

The Ming Shilu goes on to mention another possible instance of volley fire, this time during the Yongle Emperor's campaigns against the Mongols. In 1414 "the commander-in-chief (都督) Zhu Chong led Lü Guang and others directly to the fore, where they assaulted the enemy by firing firearms and guns continuously and in succession. Countless enemies were killed." In this case the source makes no mention of taking turns or forming lines, but Andrade believes that since the Ming were facing horseback Mongol forces, it would have been impossible to keep continuous fire in the face of a cavalry charge had ordered ranks of gunners not been implemented. The same rationality is applied to another passage on the 1422 expedition, where "the emperor ordered that all the generals train their troops outside each encampment by arranging their formations so that the gunnery units (神機銃) occupied the foremost positions and the cavalry units occupied the rear. He ordered officers to exercise and drill in their free time (暇閑操習). He admonished them as follows: "A formation that is dense is solid, while an advance force is sparse, and when they arrive at the gates of war and it's time to fight, then first use the guns to destroy their advance guard and then use cavalry to rush their solidity. In this way there is nothing to fear."" Some historians have extrapolated from this that the Ming forces were using volley fire with firearms since their opponents were cavalry units, and hence impossible to stop with slow firing hand cannons unless it was through continuous volley fire, much less with a thin advance guard of gunnery units. According to Wang Zhaochun, "the meaning of this is that when fighting, the gun troops line up in front of the entire formation, and between them there must be a certain amount of space, so that they can load bullets and powder and employ shooting by turns and in concert to destroy the enemy advance guard. Once the enemy has been thrown into chaos, the rear densely arrayed cavalry troops together come forth in great vigor, striking forth with irresistible force." Even if Wang is correct, the evidence is still inconclusive.

Ottoman Empire
The volley tactic next appeared in early 16th century Europe when the Ottoman Janissaries clashed with European forces at the Battle of Mohács on 29 August 1526. The Janissaries equipped with 2000 tüfenks (usually translated as musket) "formed nine consecutive rows and they fired their weapons row by row," in a "kneeling or standing position without the need for additional support or rest." Contrary to the popular belief that the Ottomans' success at Mohács was due to their artillery, a view which many later historians have supported, contemporary European and Ottoman sources on the battle attribute their success to the Janissaries' successful deployment of handheld firearms. However the usage of arquebuses in this battle is disputed and they may have been small cannons instead. According to a German source, 90% of the Janissaries were equipped with handheld firearms while on campaign by 1532. The Janissaries' prowess declined early in the 17th century as troop standards dropped and the drill was abandoned. According to the author of The Laws of the Janissaries (Kavanin-i Yenigeriyan), by 1606 members of the Janissaries were faced with supply issues so that they "were no longer given powder for the drills and that the soldiers used the wick for their candles and not for their muskets."

Qi Jiguang
By 1548 the Ming had started fielding arquebuses after procuring knowledge of the weapon from the pirate network at Shuangyu. The military leader Qi Jiguang, who was at first ambivalent towards matchlocks, became one of the primary advocates for their incorporation into the Ming army later on in his life. After having suffered his first defeats at the hands of the wokou, he realized the vital role of this new  weapon in combating piracy, for it out ranged their heaviest arrows. By 1560 he had invented a style of musket warfare similar to the Tang crossbow volley technique which he described the same year in his magnum opus, the Jixiao Xinshu:

Qi Jiguang further elaborates on the five layered musket volley formation:

If melee weapons could not be brought into combat, such as during long range defense, Qi recommended waiting "until the face-the-enemy signal [is given], and then, whether from behind wooden stockades, or from moat banks, or from below abatis (拒馬), [they] open up on the enemy, firing by turns (更番射賊). Those who are empty reload; those who are full fire again. While the ones who have fired are loading, those who are full then fire again. In this way, all day long, the firing of guns will not be lacking, and there must be no firing to the point of exhaustion [of ammo] and no slipups with guns." In 1571 Qi prescribed an ideal infantry regiment of 1080 arquebusiers out of 2700 men, or 40 percent of the infantry force. However it is not known how well this was actually implemented, and there is evidence that Qi was met with stiff resistance to the incorporation of newer gunpowder weapons in northern China while he was stationed there. He writes that "in the north soldiers are stupid and impatient, to the point that they cannot see the strength of the musket, and they insist on holding tight to their fast lances (a type of fire lance), and although when comparing and vying on the practice field the musket can hit the bullseye ten times better than the fast-lance and five times better than the bow and arrow, they refuse to be convinced."

Japan
The musket volley fire technique may have been used in Japan as well as early as 1575 at the Battle of Nagashino by Oda Nobunaga's arquebusiers. But this has been called into dispute in recent years by J.S.A. Elisonas and J.P. Lamers in their translation of The Chronicle of Oda Nobunaga by Ota Gyuichi. In Lamers' Japonius he says that "whether or not Nobunaga actually operated with three rotating ranks cannot be determined on the basis of reliable evidence." They claim that the version of events describing volley fire was written several years after the battle, and an earlier account says to the contrary that guns were fired en masse. However both Korean and Chinese sources note that Japanese gunners were making use of volley fire during the Japanese invasions of Korea (1592–98).

Europe
Frederick Lewis Taylor claims that a kneeling volley fire may have been employed by Prospero Colonna's arquebusiers as early as the Battle of Bicocca (1522). However this has been called into question by Tonio Andrade who believes this is an over interpretation as well as mis-citation of a passage by Charles Oman suggesting that the Spanish arquebusiers kneeled to reload, when in fact Oman never made such a claim. European gunners might have implemented the volley fire to some extent since at least 1579 when the Englishman Thomas Digges suggested that musketeers should, "after the old Romane manner make three or four several fronts, with convenient spaces for the first to retire and unite himselfe with the second, and both these if occasion so require, with the third; the shot [musketeers] having their convenient lanes continually during the fight to discharge their peces." The Spanish too displayed some awareness of the volley technique and described it in the military manual, Milicia, Discurso y Regla Militar, dating to 1586: "Start with three files of five soldiers each, separated one from the other by fifteen paces, and they should comport themselves not with fury but with calm skillfulness [con reposo diestramente] such that when the first file has finished shooting they make space for the next (which is coming up to shoot) without turning face, countermarching [contrapassando] to the left but showing the enemy only the side of their bodies, which is the narrowest of the body, and [taking their place at the rear] about one to three steps behind, with five or six pellets in their mouths, and two lighted matchlock fuses … and they load [their pieces] promptly … and return to shoot when it's their turn again."

Regardless, it is clear that the concept of volley fire had existed in Europe for quite some time during the 16th century, but it was in the Netherlands during the 1590s that the musketry volley really took off. The key to this development was William Louis, Count of Nassau-Dillenburg who in 1594 described the technique in a letter to his cousin:

The countermarch technique did not immediately change the nature of warfare in Europe and it would take another century of tactical and technological advancements before firearm wielding infantry could stand alone on the battlefield without the support of pikes.

Joseon
In Korea the Joseon dynasty underwent a devastating war with newly unified Japan that lasted from 1592 to 1598. The shock of this encounter spurred the court to undergo a process of military strengthening. One of the core elements of military strengthening was to adopt the musket. According to reformers, "In recent times in China they did not have muskets; they first learned about them from the Wokou pirates in Zhejiang Province. Qi Jiguang trained troops in their use for several years until they [muskets] became one of the skills of the Chinese, who subsequently used them to defeat the Japanese." By 1607 Korean musketeers had been trained in the fashion which Qi Jiguang prescribed, and a drill manual had been produced based on the Chinese leader's Jixiao Xinshu. Of the volley fire, the manual says that "every musketeer squad should either divide into two musketeers per layer or one and deliver fire in five volleys or in ten." Another Korean manual produced in 1649 describes a similar process: "When the enemy approaches to within a hundred paces, a signal gun is fired and a conch is blown, at which the soldiers stand. Then a gong is sounded, the conch stops blowing, and the heavenly swan [a double-reed horn] is sounded, at which the musketeers fire in concert, either all at once or in five volleys (齊放一次盡擧或分五擧)." This training method proved to be quite formidable in the 1619 Battle of Sarhu when 10,000 Korean musketeers managed to kill many Manchus before their allies surrendered. While Korea went on to lose both wars against the Manchu invasions of 1627 and 1636, their musketeers were well respected by Manchu leaders. It was the first Qing emperor Hong Taiji who wrote: "The Koreans are incapable on horseback but do not transgress the principles of the military arts. They excel at infantry fighting, especially in musketeer tactics."

Historical techniques

Drilling
For many Europeans this new way of conducting warfare seemed ridiculous, so that in the beginning they were openly mocked. But the Dutch army continued to drill the volley under both Louis and his cousin Maurice, Prince of Orange, so that it became second nature.  One Dutch historian recounts the exercises in which regiments marched "man by man bringing the rearmost to the front and the frontmost to the rear.… The beginnings were very difficult, and many people felt, because it was all so unusual, that it was odd and ridiculous [lacherlich]. They were mocked by the enemy, but with time the great advantages of the practices became clear … and eventually they were copied by other nations." Soon the reorganized Dutch army displayed the virtues of the countermarch volley and the practice spread across Europe. An important component to the successful deployment of volley fire was the drill, which according to Geoffrey Parker, "only two civilisation have invented drill for their infantry: China and Europe. Moreover, both of them did so twice: in the fifth century BC in North China and in Greece, and again in the late sixteenth century. Exponents of the second phase— Qi Jiguang in Imperial China and Maurice of Nassau in the Dutch Republic—explicitly sought to revive classical precedents, and in the West, marching in step and standing on parade became a permanent part of military life." Drill was difficult and the manner in which the volley fire should be executed had not been perfected in Louis' time. It is clear from Holland's historical sources that it took many trials and experiments for the process to be refined.

Indeed, just using the musket itself was considered unorthodox and in some parts of the world there was even a push back against the incorporation of muskets. According to Qi Jiguang, this was because:

18th century
In the European armies there were several volley fire techniques for the effective use of a huge mass of muskets at a distance of 200-300 meters. It should be understood that the main goal of volley fire is to save ammunition, and not accuracy. For more accurate and deadly fire, light infantry companies and regiments are created in all armies. These soldiers have much better training and are able to conduct effective fire with single shots, rather than massive volleys. Light infantry covers the line infantry from the fire of enemy skirmishers, while the line infantry concentrates massive fire along the infantry line or cavalry of the enemy.

Several different methods were used: in the Swedish army, a battalion would approach the enemy, fire one or several volleys, and then charge the enemy with swords, pikes and (later) bayonets, a style they dubbed "Gå På" (which translates roughly as "Go at them"). The Dutch developed the system of platoon firing, which was perfected by the British during the 18th century: here, the battalion, lined up in three rows, was divided into 24-30 platoons which would fire alternately, thus concentrating their fire. This required intensive training for the soldiers, who had to operate their muskets in close ranks. After the command to make ready was given, the first rank knelt down, whilst the third rank stepped slightly to the right, in order to level their muskets past the men in front of them. The French army had trouble adopting this method and relied for the most part of the 18th century on firing by ranks, in which the first rank fired first, followed by the second, and then the third rank. This method was acknowledged by the French command at the time to be far less effective. The Prussian army, reformed under the "Alte Dessauer", placed much emphasis on firepower. In order to make the men load and fire their muskets quicker, the iron ramrod was developed. Voltaire once commented that the Prussian soldiers could load and fire their muskets seven times in a minute; this is a gross exaggeration, but it is an indication of the drill, which led to platoons firing devastating volleys with clockwork precision. In all, a professional soldier was required to load and fire his musket three times in a minute.

19th and 20th centuries
Already in the American Civil War and the Franco-Prussian War, the development of modern weapons had devastating effects on the infantry, which still operated in basically 18th century style. The infantry itself also was equipped with rifles that fired faster and more accurately than the flintlock muskets, such as the French Chassepot and the Prussian needle rifle. It wasn't until World War I however that the linear tactics and volley fire were finally abandoned, after in the first stages of the war, relentless fire from artillery and machine guns had decimated the armies, and the infantry had no option but to dig in and hide in trenches. In modern times the use of volley fire is limited, since automatic weapons can devastate massed infantry on their own without volley fire formations.

Several countries, including Russia, retained the option to use volley fire until the close of the Second World War, as evidenced by all Mosin rifles being fitted with 'volley sights' for 2000m (sometimes 2000 arshin, or 1422.4m in early black powder Mosins)

Depictions 

Movies often give wrongful depictions of linear tactics and warfare in the early modern period. Volley fire can be seen in many movies such as Pirates of the Caribbean: At World's End. Most accurately, volley fire was depicted in the movie Zulu, a fictionalization of the Battle of Rorke's Drift. To defend a fixed position, British infantry used two-rank volley fire to decimate an attack by a large Zulu force. Despite the Zulus' superior numbers, the attack collapsed under the relentless volley fire they faced.

Citations

See also
 Salvo

References
 
 
 
 
 

Military tactics
Military history of China